The 1994 Skoda Czech Open was a men's tennis tournament played on Clay in Prague, Czech Republic that was part of the International Series of the 1994 ATP Tour.
Sergi Bruguera successfully defended his title, by defeating Andrei Medvedev 6–3, 6–4 in the final.

Seeds

Draw

Finals

Top half

Bottom half

References

External links
 Official results archive (ATP)
 Official results archive (ITF)

Prague Open (1987–1999)
1994 ATP Tour